Hajji Jafar Kandi (also Romanized as Ḩājjī Ja‘far Kandī) is a village in Savalan Rural District, in the Central District of Parsabad County, Ardabil Province, Iran. At the 2006 census, its population was 144, in 31 families.

References 

Towns and villages in Parsabad County